Flourens may refer to:

Places
Flourens, Haute-Garonne, a commune of France, in the Haute-Garonne département

People
Émile Flourens (1841–1920), French revolutionary and writer
Gustave Flourens (1838–1871), French politician
Jean Pierre Flourens (1794–1867), French physiologist